Deok-su (pronounced ), also spelled Deok-soo, Duk-soo, or Duck-soo, is a Korean given male name. Its meaning differs based on the hanja used to write each syllable of the name. There is one hanja with the reading "deok" (meaning "morality") and 67 hanja with the reading "su" on the South Korean government's official list of hanja which may be registered for use in given names. 

People with this name include:
Chang Deok-soo (1894–1947), Korean journalist and independence activist
Han Duk-su (1907–2001), founder of the pro-North Korean General Association of Korean Residents in Japan (Chungryon)
Moon Deoksu (born 1928), South Korean poet
Ahn Deok-su (born 1946), South Korean politician with the Saenuri party
Han Duck-soo (born 1949), South Korean politician, Prime Minister from 2007 to 2008
Kang Duk-soo (born 1950), South Korean businessman
Kim Deok-soo (born 1987), South Korean footballer

See also
List of Korean given names

References

Korean masculine given names